Ramón Torres may refer to:
 Ramón Torres Méndez (1809–1885), Colombian painter and lithographer
 Ramón Torres Martínez (1924–2008), Mexican architect
 Ramón Torres (baseball) (born 1993), Dominican baseball infielder
 Ramón Torres (wrestler) (1932–2000), American professional wrestler
 Ramón Torres (singer) (born 1949), Dominican singer-songwriter
 Ramón Torres Braschi (1917–1983), Puerto Rican police officer 
 Ramon Torres Hernandez (1971–2012), American serial killer